Lukas Achterberg (born May 27, 1996) is a German professional kickboxer. As of October 2022, he is ranked as the tenth best light heavyweight kickboxer in the world by Beyond Kick and Combat Press.

Kickboxing career 
Achterberg faced Rinus Douma for the vacant Big Game -95 kg title at Big Game 2 on March 13, 2018. He captured the vacant title by unanimous decision. Achterberg next faced Baran Er at Fair FC 8 on October 6, 2018. He won the fight by unanimous decision. Achterberg faced Ali Boutaleb at Knock Out 2018 on November 24, 2018. Boutaleb retired from the bout at the end of the first round, after being dropped with an uppercut, which the referee failed to call.

Actherberg faced Feliciano Weiß at Big Game 3 on March 23, 2019. He won the fight by unanimous decision. Achterberg was next booked to face Cedric Lushima, a mixed martial artist, at Ultimate Sparta Championship on April 13, 2019. He won the fight by unanimous decision.

Achterberg faced Kevin Heerschlag at Fair FC 9 on October 5, 2019. He won the fight by second-round knockout, flooring Heerschlag with a head kick which left him unable to rise from the canvas. A month later, on November 23, Achterberg faced Ahmed Shah Ghazikhnani in a non-title bout. He won the bout by unanimous decision. 

Achterberg faxed Sandro Zulčić for the vacant Fair FC light heavyweight at Fair FC 10 on October 4, 2020. He won the fight by a second-round knockout.

Achterberg made his Enfusion debut against Peter Verhaegh at Enfusion 103 on October 23, 2021. He won the fight by unanimous decision.

Achterberg faced took part in a 16-man tournament, held at Gladiator Fight Night IV on May 7, 2022. Achterberg won the quarterfinals bout of the tournament against Yankuba Fatajo by a second-round technical knockout, stopping his opponent with a flurry of punches at the very last second of the round. Achterberg faced Rafael Hering in the semifinals and won the fight by unanimous decision. This proved to be his toughest fight of the night, as he was able to cleanly knock out Jolton Peregino with a left hook in the second round of the finals.

Achterberg faced Anthony Leroy in his SENSHI debut at SENSHI 13 on September 10, 2022. He won the fight by a first-round knockout, stopping Leroy with a flying knee.

Championships and accomplishments

Professional
Fair Fight Championship
Fair FC Light Heavyweight (-91 kg) Championship
Gladiator Fight Night
Gladiator Fight Night Light Heavyweight (-93 kg) Tournament title

Amateur
International Federation of Muaythai Associations
 2017 IFMA European Championships B-class -91kg

Fight record

|-  style="background:#cfc"
| 2023-03-11 || Win ||align=left| Perry Reichling || Golden Event 3|| Würselen, Germany || Decision || 3 || 3:00
|-
|-  style="background:#cfc"
| 2022-09-10 || Win ||align=left| Anthony Leroy || Senshi 13 || Wuppertal, Germany || KO (Flying knee) || 1 || 1:38
|-
|-  style="background:#cfc"
| 2022-05-07 || Win ||align=left| Jolton Peregino || Gladiator Fight Night IV, Tournament Finals || Ingolstadt, Germany || KO (Left hook)  || 2 || 1:53
|-
! style=background:white colspan=9 |
|-
|-  style="background:#cfc"
| 2022-05-07 || Win ||align=left| Rafael Hering || Gladiator Fight Night IV, Tournament Semifinals || Ingolstadt, Germany ||  Decision (Unanimous) || 3 || 3:00
|-
|-  style="background:#cfc"
| 2022-05-07 || Win ||align=left| Yankuba Fatajo || Gladiator Fight Night IV, Tournament Quarterfinals || Ingolstadt, Germany || TKO (Referee stoppage) || 2 || 2:59
|-
|-  style="background:#cfc"
| 2021-10-23|| Win ||align=left| Peter Verhaegh || Enfusion 103 || Wuppertal, Germany || Decision (Unanimous) || 3 || 3:00
|-
|-  style="background:#cfc"
| 2020-10-04 || Win ||align=left| Sandro Zulčić || Fair FC 10 || Bochum, Germany || TKO (Punches) || 2 || 0:32
|-
! style=background:white colspan=9 |
|-
|-  style="background:#cfc"
| 2019-11-23 || Win ||align=left| Ahmed Shah Ghazikhnani  || Knockout 2019 || Vaals, Belgium || Decision (Unanimous) || 3 || 3:00 
|-
|-  style="background:#cfc"
| 2019-10-05 || Win ||align=left| Kevin Heerschlag || Fair FC 9 || Bochum, Germany || TKO (Referee stoppage) || 2 || 0:30 
|-
|-  style="background:#cfc"
| 2019-04-13 || Win ||align=left| Cedric Lushima || Ultimate Sparta Championship || Würselen, Germany || Decision (Unanimous) || 3 || 3:00  
|-
|-  style="background:#cfc"
| 2019-03-23 || Win ||align=left| Feliciano Weiß || Big Game 3 || Bochum, Germany || Decision (Unanimous) || 3 || 3:00 
|-
|-  style="background:#cfc"
| 2018-11-24 || Win ||align=left| Ali Boutaleb || Knock Out 2018 || Vaals, Belgium || TKO (Retirement) || 1 || 3:00 
|-
|-  style="background:#cfc"
| 2018-10-06 || Win ||align=left| Baran Er || Fair FC 8 || Bochum, Germany || Decision (Unanimous) || 3 || 3:00
|-
|-  style="background:#cfc"
| 2018-03-12 || Win ||align=left| Rinus Douma || Big Game 2 || Bochum, Germany || Decision (Unanimous) || 5 || 3:00
|-
! style=background:white colspan=9 |
|-
| colspan=9 | Legend:    

|-  style="background:#cfc"
| 2017-10-20 || Win ||align=left| Mehmet Ali Ugurlu || 2017 IFMA European Championships, Final || Paris, France || RSC.O || 1 || 
|-
! style=background:white colspan=9 |

|-
| colspan=9 | Legend:

See also
List of male kickboxers

References

Living people
1996 births
German male kickboxers
Sportspeople from Aachen
21st-century German people